Farm to Market Road 969 (FM 969) is a  farm-to-market road located in Travis and Bastrop counties in the U.S. state of Texas.

Route description 
FM 969 begins at an intersection with Loop 111 (Airport Boulevard), east of Interstate 35. Between Austin and Webberville, FM 969 is named Webberville Road. Several graveyards dating to the Republic of Texas era are located along this segment.

History 
FM 969 originally started at SH 29 at 19th Street, northeast of downtown Austin; at the time, SH 29 was along the current alignment of Loop 111. It then proceeded eastward along 19th Street, terminating near Hornsby Bend. On December 17, 1952, FM 969 was extended east to FM 1704. On September 23, 1953, FM 969 was extended west to US 81 (now I-35) On March 26, 1958, it had been extended to its current eastern termination point at SH 71/SH 21.

In 1975, 19th Street was renamed MLK Boulevard between Lamar Boulevard and the Austin city limits.

On July 11, 1986, the segment between I-35 and Loop 111 was removed from FM 969 and returned to city maintenance. This segment passes by Oakwood Cemetery, the oldest cemetery in Austin, and by UFCU Disch-Falk Field, the University of Texas at Austin baseball field.

On June 27, 1995, the segment of FM 969 between Loop 111 and FM 973 was redesignated Urban Road 969 (UR 969), while the segment east of FM 973 remained FM 969. The designation of the UR 969 section reverted to FM 969 with the elimination of the Urban Road system on November 15, 2018.

The bridge over Walnut Creek between US 183 and SH 130 was rebuilt between 2001 and 2003.

Junction list

References

0969
Transportation in Austin, Texas
Transportation in Travis County, Texas
Transportation in Bastrop County, Texas